Peter George Knapp (born 27 October 1949) is a British rower who competed in the 1968 Summer Olympics.  In 1968 he was a crew member of the British boat which finished tenth in the Men’s coxed eights event.

Knapp was born in London and educated at Bedford Modern School and the University of London.

External links
Peter Knapp at Sports Reference

References

1949 births
Living people
British male rowers
Olympic rowers of Great Britain
Rowers at the 1968 Summer Olympics
People educated at Bedford Modern School